Klavdiya Aleksandrovna Tochonova (16 November 1921 – 30 May 2004) was a Soviet track and field athlete who competed mainly in the shot put. She won a bronze medal at the 1952 Summer Olympics and silver at the 1950 European Championships. In October 1949 she set a world record of 14.86 m in Tbilisi. Tochonova won the shot put event at the 1949 and 1951 World Student Games and at the 1951 Soviet championships. After retiring from competitions she worked as an athletics coach in Saint Petersburg.

References

1921 births
2004 deaths
Russian female shot putters
Soviet female shot putters
Olympic athletes of the Soviet Union
Athletes (track and field) at the 1952 Summer Olympics
Olympic bronze medalists for the Soviet Union
European Athletics Championships medalists
Medalists at the 1952 Summer Olympics
Olympic bronze medalists in athletics (track and field)
Sportspeople from Tver